Leslie Russell Thoms (March 7, 1938 - December 5, 1999) was a Canadian politician, who represented the electoral district of Grand Bank in the Newfoundland House of Assembly from 1979 to 1982. He was a member of the Liberal Party.

Prior to his election to the legislature, Thoms had been a supporter of Bill Rowe's 1977 campaign for the Liberal leadership, although Rowe stepped aside in favour of Don Jamieson by the time of the 1979 Newfoundland general election. Thoms was elected to the legislature in that election. Due to the Liberal Party's loss, Jamieson stepped down as leader following the election and Thoms ran as a candidate in the resulting leadership convention, but ultimately lost to Len Stirling.

Thoms was defeated in the 1982 Newfoundland and Labrador general election by Bill Matthews of the Progressive Conservatives.

He subsequently worked as a staff lawyer in the provincial Ministry of Justice.

He died on December 5, 1999, in St. John's.

Electoral record

 
|NDP
|Harvey Tulk, Jr.
|align="right"|198
|align="right"|3.8
|align="right"|
|-
|}

 
|NDP
|Eric Miller
|align="right"|234
|align="right"|4.23
|align="right"|
|-
|}

References

1938 births
1999 deaths
Liberal Party of Newfoundland and Labrador MHAs
20th-century Canadian politicians